I Can Quit Whenever I Want: Ad Honorem is a 2017 Italian crime comedy film directed by Sydney Sibilia.

It is the third and final installment in the I Can Quit trilogy, following I Can Quit Whenever I Want and I Can Quit Whenever I Want: Masterclass.

Cast

References

External links
 

2017 films
2017 comedy films
2010s crime comedy films
Films about drugs
Films directed by Sydney Sibilia
Films set in Rome
Films shot in Rome
Italian crime comedy films
Latin-language films
2010s Italian-language films
2010s Italian films